Fraxinus papillosa, the Chihuahuan ash, is a species of flowering plant in the family Oleaceae, native to the deserts of Mexico and the southwestern United States. A small tree, it usually is found growing in canyon bottoms and on north-facing slopes.

References

papillosa
Flora of Arizona
Flora of the South-Central United States
Flora of Northwestern Mexico
Flora of Northeastern Mexico
Flora of Southwestern Mexico
Plants described in 1907